Shadows of the Past is a 1922 German silent film directed by Rudolf Biebrach and starring Gertrude Welcker, Ernst Hofmann and Erich Kaiser-Titz.

Cast
 Gertrude Welcker as Helga
 Ernst Hofmann as Arvid Paulsen - Secretary
 Erich Kaiser-Titz as Löwenborg
 Anton Edthofer as Jens Holmberg - Artist
 Heinrich Schroth as Henrik Krag - Private Detective
 Rudolf Biebrach as Christensen
 Josefine Dora as Mrs. Hendersen
 Erna Hauk as Gerda

References

Bibliography
 Hans-Michael Bock & Michael Töteberg. Das Ufa-Buch. Zweitausendeins, 1992.

External links

1922 films
Films of the Weimar Republic
German silent feature films
Films directed by Rudolf Biebrach
German black-and-white films
UFA GmbH films
German drama films
1922 drama films
Silent drama films
1920s German films
1920s German-language films